Harold Edwin Hurst (1 January 1880 – 7 December 1978) was a British hydrologist from Leicester. Hurst's (1951) study on measuring the long-term storage capacity of reservoirs documented the presence of long-range dependence in hydrology, especially concerning the fluctuations of the water level in the Nile River. In doing so, he developed the empirical rescaled range methodology for measuring long-range dependence. Much of Hurst's research was motivated by his empirical observations of the Nile. The Hurst exponent, which has been used in other fields, such as finance and cardiology, was named after him.

His work in Egypt started in 1906 and lasted 62 years doing his best work after he reached 65. He championed the prelude to the new Aswan High Dam project which was built using his plan.

References

Mandelbrot, Benoît B., The (Mis)Behavior of Markets, A Fractal View of Risk, Ruin and Reward (Basic Books, 2004)
 Hurst, H., 1951, "Long Term Storage Capacity of Reservoirs," Transactions of the American Society of Civil Engineers, 116, 770-799.
 
 Hurst, H., The Nile: A General Account of the River and the Utilization of Its Waters (Constable, 1952).
 Hurst, H., The Lake Plateau Basin of the Nile, Government Press, 1927.
 Hurst, H., Black and Simaika, 'The Future Conservation of the Nile', Nile Basin, vol. VII, 1946.

External links
 
 

1880 births
1978 deaths
British hydrologists